The 1950 NCAA basketball tournament involved 8 schools playing in single-elimination play to determine the national champion of men's NCAA college basketball. It began on March 23, 1950, and ended with the championship game on March 28 in New York City, New York. A total of 10 games were played, including a third place game in each region and a national third place game.

CCNY, coached by Nat Holman, won the national title with a 71–68 victory in the final game over Bradley, coached by Forddy Anderson. Irwin Dambrot of CCNY was named the tournament's Most Outstanding Player.  CCNY became the only team to ever win both the NIT and NCAA tournaments in the same year.  Because of participation changes, this currently cannot happen.  CCNY is also the only championship team which is not currently a member of Division I. They dropped down to the NCAA College Division in the 1963–64 season. The CCNY point shaving scandal of 1950–51 had hit the program hard, and they had 12 sub-par seasons from 1951–52 through 1962–63 before dropping down to the College Division.

The 1950 tournament was the last tournament to feature eight teams.  The field would expand to sixteen teams the next year.

Locations
The following are the sites selected to host each round of the 1950 tournament:

Regionals

March 23, 24, and 25
East Regional, Madison Square Garden, New York, New York
March 23 and 25
West Regional, Municipal Auditorium, Kansas City, Missouri

Championship Game

March 28
Madison Square Garden, New York, New York

For the seventh and final time, Madison Square Garden hosted the National Championship game. This would be the last final held in the New York metropolitan area until 1996, and the last final to date held in New York City itself. This was the seventh time in eight years that this particular venue arrangement would be used; both buildings would host the regionals for one more year.

Teams

Bracket

Regional third place games

Point shaving scandal

Further reading

See also
 1950 National Invitation Tournament
 1950 NAIA Basketball Tournament

References

NCAA Division I men's basketball tournament
Ncaa
NCAA  Basketball Tournament
NCAA basketball tournament